Odessos  may refer to:

 An ancient Milesian colony, now Varna, Bulgaria
 The Greek name for Odessa, Ukraine